Bucharest Pipera Airfield was located in the Pipera neighborhood of Bucharest, Romania, at the northern edge of the city, right next to the town of Voluntari, Ilfov County. The airport no longer exists.

History
The airfield was built in the interwar period. The first direct flight from Paris to Bucharest was done by the French–Romanian airline company CIDNA/CFRNA, with a plane piloted by Albert Louis Deullin, who landed at Pipera Airport in October 1921.

During World War II, Pipera Airport was the main military airport in the Bucharest area. Some units of the Romanian Air Force units were flying IAR 80 planes (built in Brașov), while a unit under the command of Mihail Romanescu-Leu was flying Messerschmitt Bf 109 planes from there. In the Fall of 1940,  Major Gotthard Handrick and a group German fighter pilots who had participated in the Battle of Britain were sent by Adolf Hitler to help train the Romanian pilots at this airbase. After Romania entered the war on the side of the Axis powers, pilots based at the Pipera airfield participated in the battles on the Eastern Front, including the Siege of Odessa and the Battle of Stalingrad.

In the Spring of 1951, after the start of communist rule in Romania, aircraft repair facilities which had previously been located at the Cotroceni airfield were moved to Pipera. In a secret report from June 1953, the Central Intelligence Agency assessed the facilities at the Pipera airfield as being the second best in  Romania after those at Stalin Airfield near Brașov (Stalin City at the time).  The repair facility employed 250 civilian workers who serviced military aircraft.

The airport was dismantled in 1958. On its former site, the Aviation Museum of Bucharest was inaugurated on 18 March 2006. Some of the old hangars have been incorporated into the museum, while the runway has been replaced by the Dimitrie Pompeiu Road and an office building. A local police station is also located on the same grounds.

See also

Aviation in Romania
Transport in Romania

References

Transport in Bucharest
Airports in Romania
Buildings and structures in Bucharest
1958 disestablishments in Romania